Tenement (also known as Game of Survival and Slaughter in the South Bronx) is a 1985 American exploitation thriller film directed by Roberta Findlay.

The film follows the violent chaos that ensues when the tenants of an apartment house in a South Bronx slum rise up against the brutal, drug-pushing street gang that attempts to take over their apartment and terrorize them.  The film was given an X rating by the Motion Picture Association of America, and is one of a small number of films to receive such a rating solely for violence.

References

External links
 
 

1985 films
1980s exploitation films
American action thriller films
Films shot in New York City
1985 action thriller films
American exploitation films
American splatter films
Hood films
American films about revenge
Films set in the Bronx
Films set in apartment buildings
1980s English-language films
1980s American films